Fratte may refer to several places in Italy:

Fratte, ancient name of Ausonia, a municipality of the Province of Frosinone, Lazio
Fratte, a suburban quarter of Salerno, Campania
Fratte, a civil parish of Santa Giustina in Colle (PD), Veneto
Fratte Rosa, a municipality of the Province of Pesaro and Urbino, Marche
Sant'Angelo Le Fratte, a municipality of the Province of Potenza, Basilicata
Sant'Andrea delle Fratte, a basilica church in Rome

See also
Fratta (disambiguation)